Desart Court was a house in County Kilkenny, Ireland, built around 1733 for the first Lord Desart, John Cuffe. The architect is believed to have been Sir Edward Lovett Pearce.

History 
The house was a two-storey core building with a basement, linked to two-storey wings, and was designed in a Palladian style. Inside there were elaborate plasterwork ceilings and notable staircases described as "handsome carved scroll-work in oak, in lieu of balusters". The house was considered a superlative example of its kind, however it was destroyed in February 1923 when it was burned by the IRA. A new house was rebuilt by Lady Kathleen Milborne-Swinnerton-Pilkington, with Richard Orpen, ⁣⁣ but it was subsequently torn down in 1957.

References

Castles in County Kilkenny
Demolished buildings and structures in the Republic of Ireland
Buildings and structures demolished in 1923
1923 fires in Europe
Edward Lovett Pearce buildings
Palladian architecture in Ireland
Buildings and structures demolished in 1957
Fires in Ireland